Nipawin was a provincial electoral district  for the Legislative Assembly of the province of Saskatchewan, Canada. This district was created before the 9th Saskatchewan general election in 1938 as "Torch River", after the rural municipality and the river that flows through it. Redrawn and renamed "Nipawin" in 1952, the constituency was dissolved before the 23rd Saskatchewan general election in 1995.

It is now part of the constituencies of Carrot River Valley and Saskatchewan Rivers.

Members of the Legislative Assembly

Torch River (1938–1952)

Nipawin (1952–1995)

Election results

Torch River (1938–1952)

|-

 
|CCF
|Harry Fenster
|align="right"|1,354
|align="right"|28.58%
|align="right"|–

 
|Conservative
|Conrad B. Euler
|align="right"|366
|align="right"|7.73%
|align="right"|–
|- bgcolor="white"
!align="left" colspan=3|Total
!align="right"|4,737
!align="right"|100.00%
!align="right"|

|-
 
|style="width: 130px"|CCF
|John Harris
|align="right"|2,609
|align="right"|65.39%
|align="right"|+36.81

 
|Prog. Conservative
|Keith A. Baldwin
|align="right"|535
|align="right"|13.41%
|align="right"|+5.68
|- bgcolor="white"
!align="left" colspan=3|Total
!align="right"|3,990
!align="right"|100.00%
!align="right"|

|-
 
|style="width: 130px"|CCF
|John Denike
|align="right"|2,260
|align="right"|41.19%
|align="right"|-24.20

|- bgcolor="white"
!align="left" colspan=3|Total
!align="right"|5,487
!align="right"|100.00%
!align="right"|

Nipawin (1952–1995)

|-

 
|CCF
|J.B. McDermott
|align="right"|3,451
|align="right"|44.94%
|align="right"|+3.75
 
|Prog. Conservative
|R.F. Platte
|align="right"|372
|align="right"|4.84%
|align="right"|-
|- bgcolor="white"
!align="left" colspan=3|Total
!align="right"|7,679
!align="right"|100.00%
!align="right"|

|-

 
|CCF
|John J. Morrow
|align="right"|2,325
|align="right"|34.13%
|align="right"|-10.81

|- bgcolor="white"
!align="left" colspan=3|Total
!align="right"|6,812
!align="right"|100.00%
!align="right"|

|-
 
|style="width: 130px"|CCF
|Bob Perkins
|align="right"|2,197
|align="right"|33.65%
|align="right"|-0.48

 
|Prog. Conservative
|E. Archie Mardell
|align="right"|445
|align="right"|6.82%
|align="right"|-
|- bgcolor="white"
!align="left" colspan=3|Total
!align="right"|6,529
!align="right"|100.00%
!align="right"|

|-

 
|CCF
|Bob Perkins
|align="right"|2,440
|align="right"|34.69%
|align="right"|+1.04
 
|Prog. Conservative
|John A. Whittome
|align="right"|1,942
|align="right"|27.61%
|align="right"|+20.79
|- bgcolor="white"
!align="left" colspan=3|Total
!align="right"|7,034
!align="right"|100.00%
!align="right"|

|-

 
|NDP
|Walter A. Mills
|align="right"|2,446
|align="right"|40.20%
|align="right"|+5.51
 
|Prog. Conservative
|John A. Whittome
|align="right"|1,185
|align="right"|19.47%
|align="right"|-8.14
|- bgcolor="white"
!align="left" colspan=3|Total
!align="right"|6,085
!align="right"|100.00%
!align="right"|

|-
 
|style="width: 130px"|NDP
|John Comer
|align="right"|3,759
|align="right"|46.98%
|align="right"|+6.78

 
|Progressive Conservative
|Bette Harris
|align="right"|753
|align="right"|9.41%
|align="right"|-10.06
|- bgcolor="white"
!align="left" colspan=3|Total
!align="right"|8,001
!align="right"|100.00%
!align="right"|

|-
 
|style="width: 130px"|Progressive Conservative
|Richard L. Collver
|align="right"|3,381
|align="right"|45.52%
|align="right"|+36.11
 
|NDP
|John Comer
|align="right"|2,599
|align="right"|35.00%
|align="right"|-11.98

|- bgcolor="white"
!align="left" colspan=3|Total
!align="right"|7,427
!align="right"|100.00%
!align="right"|

|-
 
|style="width: 130px"|Progressive Conservative
|Richard L. Collver
|align="right"|3,733
|align="right"|49.36%
|align="right"|+3.84
 
|NDP
|Irvin G. Perkins
|align="right"|3,262
|align="right"|43.13%
|align="right"|+8.13

|- bgcolor="white"
!align="left" colspan=3|Total
!align="right"|7,563
!align="right"|100.00%
!align="right"|

|-
 
|style="width: 130px"|Progressive Conservative
|Lloyd Sauder
|align="right"|4,267
|align="right"|53.55%
|align="right"|+4.19
 
|NDP
|Irvin G. Perkins
|align="right"|2,844
|align="right"|35.68%
|align="right"|-7.45

|- bgcolor="white"
!align="left" colspan=3|Total
!align="right"|7,969
!align="right"|100.00%
!align="right"|

|-
 
|style="width: 130px"|Progressive Conservative
|Lloyd Sauder
|align="right"|4,312
|align="right"|55.98%
|align="right"|+2.43
 
|NDP
|Gilda Treleaven
|align="right"|2,975
|align="right"|38.62%
|align="right"|+2.94

|- bgcolor="white"
!align="left" colspan=3|Total
!align="right"|7,703
!align="right"|100.00%
!align="right"|

|-
 
|style="width: 130px"|NDP
|Tom Keeping
|align="right"|3,238
|align="right"|45.25%
|align="right"|+6.63
 
|Prog. Conservative
|Jim Taylor
|align="right"|2,784
|align="right"|38.90%
|align="right"|-17.08

|- bgcolor="white"
!align="left" colspan=3|Total
!align="right"|7,156
!align="right"|100.00%
!align="right"|

See also 
Electoral district (Canada)
List of Saskatchewan provincial electoral districts
List of Saskatchewan general elections
List of political parties in Saskatchewan
Rural Municipality of Torch River No. 488
Nipawin, Saskatchewan

References 
 Saskatchewan Archives Board – Saskatchewan Election Results By Electoral Division

Former provincial electoral districts of Saskatchewan